Travelogue Live '05 is a live DVD of a Meat Beat Manifesto performance at Cabaret Metro in Chicago, Illinois, on June 22, 2005. AllMusic called the video "a visually intriguing package" and "a fun jaunt and might spice up a party."

Credits
Drums - Lynn Farmer
Sampler, Serge Modular - Mark Pistel
Video Sampler, Dvj - Ben Stokes
Video Sampler, Vocals, Synthi Aks, Bass Flute - Jack Dangers

Track listing
"Hello Cleveland"
"I Am Electro"
"Spinning Round"
"Radio Babylon"
"Japan"
"God O.D."
"Europe"
"No Purpose No Design"
"Southern States"
"She's Unreal/Helter Skelter"
"The Light Incident"
"Edge Of No Control"
"Prime Audio Soup"

References

External links
 New York Times overview

Meat Beat Manifesto albums